The International Bulletin of Mission Research (or IBMR) is an academic journal covering mission studies and world Christianity, published by the Overseas Ministries Study Center (OMSC).

History
IBMR was established in 1950 by R. Pierce Beaver as the Occasional Bulletin from the Missionary Research Library at Union Theological Seminary, New York. It started to publish quarterly since January 1977, under the name International Bulletin of Missionary Research, with the initiatives of Gerald H. Anderson, director of the OMSC between 1976 and 2000. The journal changed its name again in 2016 from the International Bulletin of Missionary Research to the International Bulletin of Mission Research, to account for the global shift in world Christianity. The current editor is Thomas J. Hastings.

References

External links

Christianity studies journals
English-language journals
Quarterly journals
Publications established in 1950
Christian missions
World Christianity